The Central District of Gilan-e Gharb County is a district (bakhsh) in Gilan-e Gharb County, Kermanshah Province, Iran. At the 2006 census, its population was 41,648, in 9,459 families.  The District has one city: Gilan-e Gharb. The District has four rural districts (dehestan): Cheleh Rural District, Direh Rural District, Howmeh Rural District, and Vizhenan Rural District.

References 

Gilan-e Gharb County
Districts of Kermanshah Province